Caterina Chinnici (born 5 November 1954) is an Italian magistrate and politician who has been serving as a Member of the European Parliament since 2014.

Early life and career
Born in Palermo, Chinnici is the daughter of the judge Rocco Chinnici, killed by the Sicilian Mafia in 1983. Graduated in law at 21 years old, she was  Prosecutor General of the Court of Appeal of Caltanissetta, and Public Prosecutor at the juvenile court in Caltanissetta and later in Palermo.

In June 2009, the president of Sicily Raffaele Lombardo appointed her regional councillor for family and local governments, and then regional councillor for the civil service until July 2012.

Member of the European Parliament
In the 2014 European elections, Chinnici became a Member of the European Parliament (MEP) with the Democratic Party. She has since been a member of the Committee on Civil Liberties, Justice and Home Affairs. In addition, she has been serving as vice-chair of the Committee on Budgetary Control since 2019. She was a member of the Special Committee on Terrorism between 2017 and 2018.

In addition to her committee assignments, Chinnici serves as co-chairwoman of the European Parliament Intergroup on Children's Rights. She is also a member of the European Parliament Intergroup on Fighting against Poverty, the European Parliament Intergroup on Integrity (Transparency, Anti-Corruption and Organized Crime) and the European Parliament Intergroup on Cancer.

Other activities
In 2014, Chinnici released the autobiographical book È così lieve il tuo bacio sulla fronte.

References

External links 

European Parliament - Alessia Mosca

1954 births
Living people
Politicians from Palermo
Democratic Party (Italy) MEPs
MEPs for Italy 2014–2019
MEPs for Italy 2019–2024
21st-century women MEPs for Italy
Jurists from Palermo